Edmund Morel may refer to:

 Edmund Morel (railway engineer) (1840–1871), British railway civil engineer
 E. D. Morel (1873–1924), British journalist, author, and socialist politician